The 2001 Lunar New Year Cup (aka Carlsberg Cup) was a football tournament held in Hong Kong over the first and fourth day of the Chinese New Year holiday.

Participating teams
  Hong Kong League XI (host)

Squads

Hong Kong League XI
Some of the players include:
  Viktor Derbunov
  Cristiano Cordeiro
  Dejan Antonić
  Ailton de Araujo
  Andrew Roddie
  Paul Ritchie
  John Moore
  Gerardo Laterza
  Gary McKeown
  Dimitre Kalkanov
  Gerard Guy Ambassa
  Luk Koon Pong
  Aderbal Filho
  Cornelius Udebuluzor

Korea Republic
Coach:  Guus Hiddink

Norway
Coach: Nils Johan Semb

Paraguay
Coach: Víctor Genés

Results

Semifinals

Third place match

Final

Bracket

Scorers
 3 goals
  Frode Johnsen

 2 goals
  Thorstein Helstad
  Ko Jong-soo

 1 goal
  Kim Do-hoon
  Gustavo Morinigo
  John Moore

See also
Hong Kong Football Association
Hong Kong First Division League

References
 Wing Lung Bank 2008 Lunar New Year Cup – Past Results, HKFA Website
 Carlsberg Cup 2001, Rsssf.com
 XIX. Carlsberg Cup Chinese New Years Tournament 2001 – Details, YANSFIELD

2001
2001 in South Korean football
2000–01 in Hong Kong football
2001 in Paraguayan football
2001 in Norwegian football